Aiptasia diaphana, commonly known as the yellow aiptasia or glasrose, is a species of sea anemone native to shallow waters in the temperate eastern Atlantic Ocean and the Mediterranean Sea. It has been introduced into the Red Sea.

Description
The column is yellowish-brown or brownish-green, smooth and retractable. The colour is somewhat variable because symbiotic algae (zooxanthellae) are sometimes present in the tissues. The oral disc is transparent and bears, round the rim, four or five whorls of slender, pointed tentacles making a total of up to 160 tentacles. These are translucent with white bases, a distinguishing feature for this species.

Distribution and habitat
Aiptasia diaphana is native to the Atlantic coast of Portugal, the Canary Islands and throughout the Mediterranean Sea and has been introduced to the Red Sea. It is often found at high densities.

Biology
Aiptasia diaphana catches passing invertebrates, marine larvae and small fish with its tentacles, immobilising the prey with its cnidocytes (stinging cells). It also obtains nourishment from the zooxanthellae in its tissues. These photosynthetic algae manufacture carbohydrates in sunlight and these nutrients are available to the sea anemone.

Aiptasia diaphana reproduces by both sexual and asexual reproduction and does so under different conditions. In the summer the main method is pedal laceration; the sea anemone crawls along the substrate and fragments of the base become detached, each fragment growing into a new individual, a clone of the parent. Under laboratory conditions, an adult female can produce males, females and hermaphrodite individuals in this way.

References

Aiptasiidae
Animals described in 1869